I Suck on That Emotion is the second studio album by Weird War, recorded and released under the short-lived name Scene Creamers.

Track #11, "Here Comes The Judge, Pt II", shares the same name as a The Make-Up song from their 1997 album After Dark, of which Svenonius, Mae, and Minoff were all members.

Track listing
"Better All the Time" − 4:15
"Session Man" − 2:47
"Wet Paint" − 4:32
"Candidate" − 3:44
"Luxembourg" − 2:13
"Bag Inc." − 3:55
"Elfin Orphan" − 2:35
"What About Me?" − 4:40
"Hey Lonnie" − 2:56
"Housework for 3" − 2:46
"Here Comes The Judge, Pt II" − 3:02
"One Stone" − 4:05

Personnel
 Blake Brunner – drums
 Michelle Mae – electric bass, electric guitar, voices
 Alex Minoff – electric guitar, voices
 Ian Svenonius – vocals
 Phil Manley – engineer

References

2003 albums
Weird War albums
Drag City (record label) albums